Timmerman Hill is a mountain in Greene County, New York. It is located in the Catskill Mountains southeast of Lawrenceville. Bethel Ridge is located north, and Vedder Mountain is located north-northeast of Timmerman Hill.

References

Mountains of Greene County, New York
Mountains of New York (state)